Claudia is a small (700 meter) crater that defines the prime meridian of asteroid 4 Vesta in the coordinate system used by the Dawn mission team, NASA, and the IAU Gazetteer of Planetary Nomenclature, though it is not accepted by the IAU as a whole. It is located at 1.6°S and 4.0°W. 

Claudia was chosen because it is small, sharply defined, easy to find, and near the equator. The prime meridian runs 4° to the west. This results in a more logical set of mapping quadrants than the IAU coordinate system, which drifts over time due to an error in calculating the position of the pole, and is based on the 200 km Olbers Regio, which is so poorly defined that it is not even visible to the Dawn spacecraft. 

The crater was named after the Roman Vestal Virgin Claudia on 2011 September 30.

References

Impact craters on asteroids
Surface features of 4 Vesta